Vidura is an Indian and Sri Lankan name that may refer to the following notable people:
Given name
Vidura Nawale, Indian politician
Vidura Wickremanayake (born 1959), Sri Lankan politician

Surname
Kasun Vidura (born 1993), Sri Lankan cricketer

Sinhalese masculine given names
Sinhalese surnames